The Debate between Winter and Summer or Myth of Emesh and Enten is a Sumerian creation myth, written on clay tablets in the mid to late 3rd millennium BC.

Disputations

Seven "debate" topics are known from the Sumerian literature, falling in the category of 'disputations'; some examples are: the debate between sheep and grain; the debate between bird and fish; the tree and the reed; and the dispute between silver and copper, etc. These topics came some centuries after writing was established in Sumerian Mesopotamia. The debates are philosophical and address humanity's place in the world.

Compilation

The first lines of the myth were discovered on the University of Pennsylvania Museum of Archaeology and Anthropology, catalogue of the Babylonian section (CBS), tablet number 8310 from their excavations at the temple library at Nippur. This was translated by George Aaron Barton in 1918 and first published as "Sumerian religious texts" in "Miscellaneous Babylonian Inscriptions", number seven, entitled "A Hymn to Ibbi-Sin". Barton describes Ibbi-Sin as an "inglorious King" suggesting the text to have been composed during his lifetime, he commented "The hymn provides a powerful statement for emperor worship in Ur at the time of composition." Ibbi-Sin is still mentioned in the modern translation "For my king named by Nanna, the son of Enlil, Ibbi-Sin, when he is arrayed in the 'cutur' garment and the 'hursag' garment."

Another tablet from the same collection, number 8886 was documented by Edward Chiera in "Sumerian Epics and Myths", number 46. Samuel Noah Kramer included CBS  tablets 3167, 10431, 13857, 29.13.464, 29.16.142 (which forms a join with 8310), 29.16.232, 29.16.417, 29.16.427, 29.16.446 and 29.16.448. He also included translations from tablets in the Nippur collection of the Museum of the Ancient Orient in Istanbul, catalogue numbers 2705, 3167 and 4004. Further tablets from Nippur were added by Jane Heimerdinger. Other tablets were added from the "Ur excavations texts" in 1928 along with several others to bring it to its present form. A later edition of the text were published by Miguel Civil in 1996.

Story

The story takes the form of a contest poem between two cultural entities first identified by Kramer as vegetation gods, Emesh and Enten. These were later identified with the natural phenomena of Summer and  Winter, respectively. The location and occasion of the story is described in the introduction with the usual creation sequence of day and night, food and fertility, weather and seasons and sluice gates for irrigation.

The two seasons are personified as brothers, born after Enlil copulates with a "hursag" (hill). The destinies of Summer and Winter are then described, Summer founding towns and villages with plentiful harvests, Winter to bring the Spring floods.

The two brothers soon decide to take their gifts to Enlil's "house of life", the E-namtila, where they begin a debate about their relative merits. Summer argues:

{{cquote|"Your straw bundles are for the oven-side, hearth and kiln. Like a herdsman or shepherd encumbered by sheep and lambs, helpless people run like sheep from oven-side to kiln, and from kiln to oven-side, in the face of you. In sunshine ...... you reach decisions, but now in the city people's teeth chatter because of you.}}

To which Winter replies:

Enlil eventually intervenes and declares Winter the winner of the debate and there is a scene of reconciliation. Bendt Alster explains "Winter prevails over Summer, because Winter provides the water that was so essential to agriculture in the hot climate of ancient Mesopotamia."Discussion

John Walton wrote that "people in the Ancient Near East did not think of creation in terms of making material things – instead, everything is function oriented. Creation thus constituted bringing order to the cosmos from an originally nonfunctional condition. Consequently, to create something (cause it to exist) in the ancient world means to give it a function, not material properties." Samuel Noah Kramer has noted this myth "is the closest extant Sumerian parallel to the Biblical Cain and Abel story" in the Book of Genesis. This connection has been made by other scholars. The disputation form  has also been suggested to have similar elements to the discussions between Job and his friends in the Book of Job. M. L. West noted similarities with Aesop's fable "a debate between Winter and Spring" along with another similar work by Bion of Smyrna.

J.J.A. van Dijk analysed the myth and determined the following common elements with other Sumerian debates "(1) Introduction, presenting the disputants and the occasion of the dispute; (2) the dispute itself, in which each party praises himself and attacks the other; (3) judgement uttered by a god, followed by reconciliation; (4) a formula of praise." Bendt Alster suggests a link to harvest festivals, saying "It is definitely conceivable that summer and winter contests may have belonged to festivals celebrating the harvest among the peasants." Herman Vanstiphout has suggested the lexical listing of offerings was used in scribal training, quoting the example from the myth "Wild Animals, cattle and sheep from the mountains, Wild rams, mountain rams, deer and full-grown ibex, Mountain sheep, first class sheep, and fat tailed sheep he brings."Eliade and Adams note that in the story, the water flows through the "hursag" (foothills), Enlil is identified as a "kurgal" (mountain) and his main temple being the "Ekur" (mountain house), they link this mountain aspect with Enlil being the "Lord of the winds" by suggesting the ancients believed the winds originated in the mountains. Piotr Michalowski makes the connection in the story that "E-hursag" is a structure "named as the residence of the king" and "E-namtilla" "as the residence of Enlil", suspecting the two words refer to the same place and that "E-namtilla is simply another name for E-hursag"'' and that it was a royal palace.

Further reading

 Bottéro, J., "La "tenson" et la réflexion sur les choses en Mésopotamie", in Reinink, G. and Vanstiphout, Herman L.J., (eds.), Dispute Poems and Dialogues in the Ancient and Medieval Near East (Orientalia Lovaniensia Analecta, 42) Peeters: Leuven, 1991, 7–22: commentary
 Bottéro, Jean, and Kramer, Samuel Noah, Lorsque les dieux faisaient l'homme. (rev.ed.), Éditions Gallimard: 1989, reprinted 1993, 481–483: translation, commentary (partial translation)
 Civil, Miguel, The Farmer's Instructions. A Sumerian Agricultural Manual. (Aula Orientalis Supplementa, 5), Editorial Ausa: Sabadell, 1994: 79, 83: commentary (ll. 181–182)
 Cooper, J.S., "Enki's Member: Eros and the Irrigation in Sumerian Literature", in Behrens, Hermann (ed.), and Loding, Darlene, and Roth, Martha Tobi, DUMU-EÛ-DUB-BA-A. Studies in Honor of Åke W. Sjöberg (Occasional Publications of the Samuel Noah Kramer Fund, 11) University Museum: Philadelphia, 1989, 87–89: commentary (ll. 12–15)
 van Dijk, J.J.A., La Sagesse suméro-accadienne. Brill: Leiden, 1953, 42–57: composite text, translation, commentary (partial edition)
 Vanstiphout, Herman L.J., "Joins Proposed in Sumerian Literary Compositions", NABU (1987), No. 87: commentary
 Vanstiphout, Herman L.J., "Lore, Learning and Levity in the Sumerian Disputations: A Matter of Form, or Substance?", in Reinink, G. and Vanstiphout, Herman L.J., (eds.), Dispute Poems and Dialogues in the Ancient and Medieval Near East (Orientalia Lovaniensia Analecta, 42), Peeters: Leuven, 1991, 23–46: commentary
 Vanstiphout, Herman L.J., "Sumerian Canonical Compositions. C. Individual Focus. 5. Disputations", in Hallo, William W. (ed.), The Context of Scripture, I: Canonical Compositions from the Biblical World Brill: Leiden/New York/Köln, 1997, 575–588. pp. 584–588: translation
 Vanstiphout, Herman L.J., "The Mesopotamian Debate Poems. A General Presentation. Part II. The Subject", Acta Sumerologica 14 (1992), 339–367. pp. 348–350: commentary

See also
 Song of the hoe
 Barton Cylinder
 Debate between sheep and grain
 Debate between bird and fish
 Enlil and Ninlil
 Self-praise of Shulgi (Shulgi D)
 Old Babylonian oracle
 Hymn to Enlil
 Kesh temple hymn
 Lament for Ur
 Sumerian creation myth
 Sumerian religion
 Sumerian literature

References

External links

 Barton, George Aaron., Miscellaneous Babylonian Inscriptions, Yale University Press, 1915. Online Version
 Cheira, Edward., Sumerian Epics and Myths, University of Chicago, Oriental Institute Publications, 1934. Online Version
 The debate between Winter and Summer., Black, J.A., Cunningham, G., Robson, E., and Zólyomi, G., The Electronic Text Corpus of Sumerian Literature, Oxford 1998–.
 Composite Text – The Electronic Text Corpus of Sumerian Literature, Oxford 1998–.

Sumerian disputations
Clay tablets
Mesopotamian myths
Mythological mountains
Creation myths
Religious cosmologies
Comparative mythology